Ahmed El-Gindy (born 21 January 1959) is an Egyptian boxer. He competed in the men's middleweight event at the 1984 Summer Olympics.

References

External links
 

1959 births
Living people
Egyptian male boxers
Olympic boxers of Egypt
Boxers at the 1984 Summer Olympics
Place of birth missing (living people)
Middleweight boxers
20th-century Egyptian people